Hubert William Kitchen (September 16, 1928 – July 18, 2020) was a Canadian politician. He served in the Newfoundland and Labrador House of Assembly as a member of the Liberal Party of Newfoundland and Labrador. He also served  in cabinet as Minister of Finance and Minister of Health. Born in Buchans, Newfoundland and Labrador, he attended McGill University, Memorial University, and the University of Alberta, earning B.Comm, B.Ed, M.Ed. and Ph.D. degrees. He was an auditor, school principal, professor of educational administration. He married Jennifer Rooney in 1957 and had a son. Kitchen died on July 18, 2020, in St. John's.

References

1928 births
2020 deaths
Liberal Party of Newfoundland and Labrador MHAs
People from Buchans